Greetwell may refer to one of two settlements in the English county of Lincolnshire:
Greetwell, North Lincolnshire
Greetwell, West Lindsey